The Centre for Technological Research of Crete (CTR-Crete) in Heraklion was founded according to the presidential decree No. 143/Φ.Ε.Κ. 123/20-6-2001 and is under the supervision and financing of the Ministry of National Education and Religious Affairs (Greece). It is a Private Legal Body, self-governed within the framework of articles 11 and 12 par. 1 of 1771/1998 Greek law and its internal regulation. There are 55 staff member, including 25 research scientists, 15 assistant researchers, and 15 associate researchers. CTR-Crete is affiliated with the Technological Educational Institute (TEI) of Crete and includes eight Sectors of Technology Transfer and Research operating in all four regional units of Crete.

Sectors of CTR-Crete

 Rural Technology and Development in Heraklion
 Operational Research and Strategical Development in Heraklion
 Natural and Built Environment in Heraklion
 Social Care and Management of Natural and Intended Disasters in  Heraklion
 Systems Design and Development and Constructions in Heraklion
 Natural Resources and Natural Disasters in Chania
 Applied Acoustics and Natural Prototyping of Music Instruments and Space in Rethymno
 Health Nutrition and Dietology in Lasithi

CTR's main targets
CTR is active in:
 The development of technological research;
 The implementation of scientific and technological achievements for solving specific problems of the production process and of the social and economic growth of the district of Crete;
 The improvement of methodology and production processes serving needs of the districts of Crete and of the entire country in general;
 The development of novel applications and products;
 Rendering of unique services, as well as
 The support of handicraft and industrial units.
 Maintaining an interactive relationship with the productive units and the organised unions of the local economy.
 Collaborating with the Technological Educational Institute of Crete and promoting the development of the relations with other institutes, research centres, universities, and other organisations of the public and private sectors.
 Elaborating studies and carrying out specific technological projects either funded by EU or ordered by third parties or in collaboration with third parties.
 Supervising the organisation and the financing of the research of technological programmes in Greece and abroad, publications, seminars and conventions.
 Producing technological products and providing novel services in accordance with its research-technological interests.
 Promoting the advanced technology transfer and disseminating of know-how.

CTR-Crete's laboratories and areas of research

 The Research and  Development of Telecommunication Systems Laboratory "PASIPHAE"

The Pasiphae Lab is part of the Centre for Technological Research of Crete 
PASIPHAE Lab research areas include:

 Computer networks
 Broadband communications (DVB-T, DVB-S, DVB-S2, DVB-H)
 Network management (QoS, DiffServ, IntServ, MPLS)
 Multimedia communications
 Network security issues
 Cellular and wireless networks (WPANs, WLANs, WMANs, WIMAX)
 Heterogeneous radio technologies and reconfigurable networks
 Wireless multimedia communications
 Traffic modeling and performance evaluation
 Ad hoc, mesh networking
 Mobile and ubiquitous computing
 Mobile and wireless networks security

Pasiphae Lab official website

External links
 Centre for Technological Research Official website
 Pasiphae Lab Official website

Research institutes in Greece
Information technology research institutes